Bramley Buffaloes RLFC is a rugby league club from the Bramley area of West Leeds in West Yorkshire, England.

History
At the end of the 1999 season Bramley RLFC resigned from the Northern Ford Premiership to become a feeder team for Leeds, but this never materialised. Bramley applied to rejoin the Northern Ford Premiership in 2000 but were rejected whilst a similar bid from Gateshead Thunder was accepted. They had planned to play games at the home of soccer club Farsley Celtic and progressively upgrade the ground, this may have been the cause of the rejection. This was rejected by the directors of the club at a public meeting.

They were reformed as a supporter-owned club, Bramley Rugby League Community Club (aka Bramley Buffaloes) as an Industrial and Provident Society. The new Bramley club applied again to rejoin the Rugby Football League several times, in 2001 playing at the home of soccer club Farsley Celtic, this was rejected as the ground did not meet the minimum criteria for grounds as per the Framing the Future guidelines  and for the 2003 season with their home games to be played at Morley Rugby Union Club, with the long-term aim of establishing their own ground. They were rejected despite meeting the grounds criteria because the stadium was not in Bramley and other clubs in the competition feared the Buffaloes would steal their fans.  and joined National League Three, also fielding a side in the Rugby League Conference. The first game against Sheffield Hillsborough Hawks drew a crowd of more than 1,200. In that first 2004 season, coached by Phil Hellewell, the club reached the NL3 Championship semi-finals, losing at eventual champions Coventry Bears. In 2005 the Buffaloes went a step further reaching the Grand Final at Widnes, losing in the last quarter to Bradford Dudley Hill.

The third season saw Paul Cook take over as head coach. He took Buffaloes to the Grand Final at the Halliwell Jones Stadium, Warrington where the Buffaloes beat Hemel Stags 30 points to 8. In 2007, NL3 was rebranded as the Rugby League Conference National Division. The Buffaloes finished top again to take the Minor Premiers Trophy, but were beaten by Featherstone Lions in the final held at Headingley.

In November 2008, Paul Cook left his post as head coach of Bramley Buffaloes to take up an assistant coach role at Huddersfield. Mark Butterill was appointed head coach with Jon Nicholls being appointed assistant coach. Buffaloes were again crowned Minor Premiers, finishing top once more but lost to Celtic Crusaders Colts in the Grand Final despite beating them three times during the season.

Bramley Buffaloes and Rodley Rockets ARLFC merged from the start of 2014. The new club will play under the Bramley Buffaloes name with their home matches at Rodley’s Canal Bank ground, but on 16 April 2015, the club announced that they had to pull out of the Yorkshire Men's League for the 2015 season (due to having no coach and a lack of players), but hope to be back for the 2016 season.

The club returned to action in the Yorkshire Men's League, playing out of Bramley Phoenix, effectively starting again, in division 5. The club appointed Steve Langton, the ex Hunslet and Carlisle player. Langton has brought a new vigour to the club and the club has refound its impetus.

Honours
Rugby League Conference National Division: 20061, 2009
Yorkshire Men's League Premier Division Champions 2014
1 Then known as National League Three.

Past coaches
Also see :Category:Bramley Buffaloes coaches

 Phil Hellewell 2004-05
 Paul Cook 2006-08
 Mark Butterill 2009-10
 Peter Roe Jan 2011-April 2011
 Chris Gardner April 2011
 Craig Lingard 2012
 Steve Gill 2013 - 2015
 Steve Langton 2016

Records

Player records
Most goals in a match: 13 by Paul Drake vs Coventry Bears, 24 April 2005
Most points in a match: 36 by Paul Drake vs Underbank Rangers, 4 September 2005
Most goals in a season: 146 by Paul Drake, 2005
Most points in a season: 382 by Paul Drake, 2005

Club records 
Highest score for: 86–0 vs Essex Eels, 19 June 2005

Bibliography
 Gateshead and Bramley sweat
 Bramley apply to rejoin RFL

References

External links
 Official website

Rugby League Conference teams
Sport in Leeds
Rugby clubs established in 2003
Rugby league teams in West Yorkshire
English rugby league teams
2003 establishments in England